Rita and Wally is an Australian situation comedy series which screened on ATN-7 in 1968. This series was a spin-off from My Name's McGooley, What's Yours?, which ran from 1966 to 1968.

When the title character Dominic McGooley (Gordon Chater) left that series, it effectively continued as a new series under this title. The other regular cast members, John Meillon and Judi Farr, played the title characters along with Noeline Brown. McGooley regular Stewart Ginn also continued in this series. Without the heavy makeup that previously transformed his appearance, he played a new character here.

The key members of the McGooley creative team also carried over to this spin-off. As an innovation the title sequence featured animated figures of the leads with photographic superimposed heads. Notable guest stars were Spike Milligan and Chips Rafferty.

Synopsis
With the spin-off the main character Wally finally received a promotion to a white-collar job and the characters moved from their previous working-class area to more salubrious surrounds. Unfortunately once the show began it became apparent that the working class setting and conflicts, along with the character of McGooley, were crucial to the comedy of the situation and Rita and Wally ended after only a few months. Rita and Wally had a run of 23 half-hour episodes.

The final episode of Rita and Wally featured the return of Stewart Ginn, Frank Taylor and Gordon Chater reprising their roles of Peregrine Nancarrow, Vile and Dominic McGooley.

Cast
 John Meillon as Wally Stiller
 Judi Farr as Rita Stiller
 Noeline Brown as Rosemary "Possum" Urkens
 Stewart Ginn as Vicar Barrington

See also 
 List of Australian television series

Notes

External links 
 
 
 Rita and Wally Classic Australian TV

Australian television sitcoms
Seven Network original programming
Television shows set in New South Wales
1968 Australian television series debuts
1968 Australian television series endings